Rus Yusupov (born May 4, 1984) is a designer and tech entrepreneur. He is best known as the co-founder of Vine and the co-founder and CEO of HQ Trivia.

Career

Early career 
Yusupov began his career as a digital product designer at firms including Razorfish and R/GA, where he worked on projects including as the lead designer on the first version of Hulu.com in 2007.

Vine 

In June 2012, Yusupov co-founded Vine, a looping, short-form video service. Vine was sold to Twitter in October 2012 for a reported $30 million, shortly before the service's official launch. In 2013, Vine hit number one on the App store for free downloads and become the most used video sharing application in the market at the time. Yusupov left Twitter in late 2015 after Vine was deprioritized by Twitter. Yusupov later tweeted, "Don't sell your company!"

Intermedia Labs 
After leaving Twitter, Yusupov co-founded Intermedia Labs, an app studio, in 2015.

The first app developed by Intermedia Labs was Hype, a platform wherein users had the ability to share a variety of multimedia content into a live broadcast.

Subsequent apps developed by Intermedia Labs include Bounce, an app that allows users to "remix" videos, and HQ Trivia, an appointment-based trivia game that is broadcast live to mobile phones.

HQ Trivia 

HQ Trivia, Intermedia's most successful app to-date, was released in August 2017. The game averaged 700,000-1,000,000 viewers for each broadcast. HQ was available worldwide on the iOS App Store and Google Play, with live shows targeted to North American, Australian, and UK audiences.

The app took the form of a live game show, played at 9 PM Eastern Time every day, and occasionally at various other times for special themed programs (focused on specific topics such as sports, music, or word-puzzles). The host of the show asked a series of (usually) twelve multiple choice questions, each with three possible answers. Those players who answered the questions correctly within the 10-second limit moved on, and the rest were eliminated. The players that correctly answered the final question split the prize money. This prize was most recently $5,000 for most games, but it had been as high as $400,000 on one occasion.

According to a 2017 Daily Beast article, Yusupov threatened to fire HQ host Scott Rogowsky if the website chose to run a profile on Rogowsky's rise to fame via HQ. Yusupov later claimed the accusations were false. HQ shut down on February 14, 2020 after its primary investors had stopped funding the company and a potential sale of HQ to an "established business" fell through.  Six weeks later, on March 29, 2020, Yusupov tweeted that HQ Trivia was returning that evening.

Industry awards and recognition 
Yusupov has received industry recognitions including a Tribeca Disruptive Innovation Award (2013), Variety Magazine Breakthrough of the Year Award (2014), PGA Digital VIP Award (2014), UJA Lydia Vareljan Leadership Award (2015) and the Webby Award's Webby 50 (2015).

HQ Trivia won the A-Train Award for Best Mobile Game at the New York Game Awards 2018. It was also nominated for a Primetime Emmy Award for Outstanding Interactive Program in 2019.

Intermedia Labs is one of Fast Company's World's Most Innovative Companies in 2018. HQ Trivia became a finalist in the Apps and Games category for Fast Company's 2018 Innovation By Design Award.

References 

Living people
1984 births
American people of Tajikistani-Jewish descent
Bukharan Jews
Businesspeople from New York (state)
20th-century American businesspeople
21st-century American businesspeople
Soviet emigrants to the United States
People from Dushanbe
Fiorello H. LaGuardia High School alumni
School of Visual Arts alumni